Jacob Beeson Jackson (April 6, 1829December 11, 1893) was the sixth Governor of West Virginia from 1881 to 1885.  In 1855, he married Maria Willard.
In his biography it is stated that he was a cousin of Stonewall Jackson.  An examination of their family trees shows that the two men were second cousins once removed.  He was also a 4th-cousin-once-removed to William Wirt Woodson who was Stonewall Jackson's half brother.

He was a son of General John Jay Jackson and his brothers were Federal Judge John Jay Jackson, Jr. and Circuit Judge and Congressman James M. Jackson.  The Jackson Memorial Fountain at Parkersburg, West Virginia is dedicated to the Jackson family.

References

External links
Biography of Jacob Beeson Jackson
Inaugural Address of Jacob Beeson Jackson

Democratic Party governors of West Virginia
1829 births
1893 deaths
Politicians from Parkersburg, West Virginia
Jackson family of West Virginia
19th-century American politicians